Andreas Soeratman (born 5 June 1937) is an Indonesian fencer. He competed in the individual épée event at the 1960 Summer Olympics.

References

External links
 

1937 births
Living people
Indonesian male épée fencers
Olympic fencers of Indonesia
Fencers at the 1960 Summer Olympics
Sportspeople from Malang
20th-century Indonesian people